Million-Dollar Haircuts on Ten-Cent Heads is the third solo studio album by German singer Andi Deris of Helloween fame. It was recorded at Mi Sueño Studios, Tenerife, with the help of three local musicians, all of them members of a band called "The White Omelette".

It was released on 13 November 2013 on Japan, on 22 November in Europe, and on 21 January in the rest of the world.

In the album, Andi criticizes the financial crisis and the globalism:

According to Deris, the title of the album means that there are many people whose heads are worth 10 cents but they actually afford million-dollar haircuts.

Track listing

Personnel
 Andi Deris - vocals, guitars
 Nico Martin - guitars
 Jezoar Marrero - bass
 Nasim López-Palacios - drums

Notes
 "Must Be Dreaming" was originally written and recorded for Brazilian band Scelerata for its album "The Sniper".
 "Enamoria" was written for cancer help foundation project Lady's Voice.

References

2013 albums
Andi Deris albums
Edel AG albums